Reginald "Reggie" Nicholson (born July 17, 1957) is an American jazz drummer.

Nicholson took a bachelor's degree in percussion performance at Chicago State University and became a member of the Association for the Advancement of Creative Musicians in 1979, working early in his career with Ed Wilkerson. In the 1980s he played with Amina Claudine Myers, Henry Threadgill, and Ernest Dawkins; he relocated to New York City in 1988 but continued his associations with Threadgill and Dawkins there. For much of the 1990s he worked with Myra Melford, and also worked in that decade with Muhal Richard Abrams, Michael Marcus, Roy Campbell, Wilber Morris, Don Pullen, Billy Bang, Charles Gayle, Leroy Jenkins, Thomas Chapin, Reuben Wilson, and Jim Nolet.

Discography

As leader/co-leader
...You See What We're Sayin'? (CIMP, 1999) BMN Trio: with Thomas Borgmann and Wilber Morris
Drum String Thing (CIMP, 2000) with Wilber Morris
Unnecessary Noise Allowed (Abstract, 1997) as The Reggie Nicholson Concept
Timbre Suite (Abstract Recordings, 2008) with Percussion Concept
Live at Tunnel (Qbico, 2009) BMN Trio with Thomas Borgmann and Wilber Morris	
Nasty & Sweet (NoBusiness, 2013) with Thomas Borgmann and Wilber Morris

As sideman
With Muhal Richard Abrams
Family Talk (Black Saint, 1993)
Think All, Focus One (Black Saint, 1994 [1995])
Song for All (Black Saint, 1995 [1997])
One Line, Two Views (New World, 1995)
With Anthony Braxton
Trillium R (Braxton House, 1999)	
With Roy Campbell
La Tierra del Fuego (Delmark, 1994)
Communion (Silkheart, 1995) 
With Thomas Chapin
You Don't Know Me (Arabesque, 1995)
Never Let Me Go: Quartets '95 & '96 (Playscape, 2012)	
With Yuko Fujiyama
Re-entry (CIMP, 2001)
With Charles Gayle
Always Born (Silkheart, 1988)
With Lindsey Horner
Never No More (Open Minds, 1991)
With Leroy Jenkins
Leroy Jenkins Live! (Black Saint, 1993)	
With Myra Melford
Jump (Enemy, 1990)
Now & Now (Enemy, 1992)
Alive in the House of Saints (hat ART, 1993)
Even the Sounds Shine (hat ART, 1995)
With Butch Morris
Testament: A Conduction Collection - Conduction 38: In Freud's Garden / Conduction 39: Thread Waxing Space / Conduction 40: Thread Waxing Space (New World, 1995)				
With Amina Claudine Myers
Jumping in the Sugar Bowl (Minor Music, 1984)
Country Girl (Minor Music, 1986)
Amina (RCA Novus, 1987)
In Touch (RCA Novus, 1989)
Women in (E)Motion (Tradition & Moderne, 1993)	
With Ernest Dawkins New Horizons Ensemble
After the Dawn Has Risen (Open Minds, 1992)
Chicago Now Vol. 1 (Slikheart, 1994 [1995])
Chicago Now Vol. 2 (Slikheart, 1994 [1997])
With Shadow Vignettes
Birth of a Notion (Sessoms, 1986)
With Malachi Thompson
Talking Horns (Delmark, 2001) with Hamiet Bluiett and Oliver Lake		
With Henry Threadgill
You Know the Number (RCA Novus, 1986)
Easily Slip Into Another World (RCA Novus, 1987)
Rag, Bush and All (RCA Novus, 1989)
Song Out of My Trees (Black Saint, 1994)
With Variable Density Sound Orchestra
Evolving Strategies (Not Two, 2014)		
With Edward Wilkerson 
Light on the Path (Sound Aspects, 1994)	
With Stefan Winter
Die Kleine Trompete / The Little Trumpet (JMT, 1986)

References
Gary W. Kennedy, "Reggie Nicholson". The New Grove Dictionary of Jazz. 2nd edition, ed. Barry Kernfeld, 2004.

American jazz drummers
Musicians from Chicago
1957 births
Living people
20th-century American drummers
American male drummers
Jazz musicians from Illinois
20th-century American male musicians
American male jazz musicians